Slobodka is a rural locality (a village) in Gorodishchenskoye Rural Settlement, Nyuksensky District, Vologda Oblast, Russia. The population was 13 as of 2002.

Geography 
Slobodka is located 43 km southeast of Nyuksenitsa (the district's administrative centre) by road. Lukino is the nearest rural locality.

References 

Rural localities in Nyuksensky District